Peter Joseph Mehringer (July 15, 1910 – August 27, 1987) was an Olympic Gold Medal-winning freestyle wrestler from Kinsley, Kansas. Mehringer was nicknamed the "Kansas Whirlwind".

After learning how to wrestle from a correspondence course, he went on to win two Kansas state championships, and three Missouri Valley Conference titles while attending the University of Kansas. He was an All-American and national runner-up at the 1932 NCAA championships. The KU sophomore won a gold medal at the 1932 Olympic Games, becoming the first KU athlete to ever have won an Olympic gold medal. Mehringer returned to KU in 1932 for his junior season and solidified his place among KU's all-time great athletes by earning All-Big Six Conference honors in football as a 214-pound tackle. Financial considerations prevented him from graduating from KU.

Mehringer went on to play professional football with the Chicago Cardinals and the Los Angeles Bulldogs, and worked occasionally as a movie extra and stunt man. Although he declined to discuss it in his later years, he is KU's only grappling icon to pursue a career in professional wrestling.

He was inducted into the National Wrestling Hall of Fame as a Distinguished Member in 1983 and the Kansas Wrestling Coaches Association Hall of Fame in 1984.

References

External links
 Kansas Wrestling Coaches Association Hall of Fame
 National Wrestling Hall of Fame and Museum
 KUhistory.com Biography
 SLAM! Sports: Overcoming the odds: Pete Mehringer's 1932 gold medal

1910 births
1987 deaths
American football tackles
People from Kinsley, Kansas
Olympic gold medalists for the United States in wrestling
Wrestlers at the 1932 Summer Olympics
American male sport wrestlers
Players of American football from Kansas
Kansas Jayhawks football players
University of Kansas alumni
Medalists at the 1932 Summer Olympics